Chico means small, boy or child in the Spanish language. It is also the nickname for Francisco in the Portuguese language.

Chico may refer to:

Places
Chico, California, a city
Chico, Montana, an unincorporated community
Chico, Texas, a town
Chico, Washington, a census designated place
Chico River (disambiguation)
Río Chico (disambiguation)
Chico Creek, Colorado
Chico Formation, a Mesozoic geologic formation in the US
Chico, or Ch'iqu, a volcano in Bolivia

People

Nickname
Alfred "Chico" Alvarez (1920–1992), Canadian trumpeter
Chico Anysio (1931–2012), Brazilian actor, comedian, writer and composer
Francisco Aramburu (1922–1997), Brazilian footballer
Chico Bouchikhi (born 1954), musician and a co-founder of the Gipsy Kings, later leader of Chico & the Gypsies
Chico Buarque (born 1944), Brazilian singer, guitarist, composer, dramatist, writer and poet
Chico (footballer, born 1981), Portuguese footballer Francisco José Castro Fernandes
Chico (footballer, born February 1987), Brazilian footballer Luis Francisco Grando
Chico (footballer, born 1991), Angolan footballer Carlos Francisco Diassonama Panzo
Chico (footballer, born 1993), full name Francisco Hyun-sol Kim, Brazilian football attacking midfielder
Chico (footballer, born 1995), Brazilian footballer Francisco Da Costa Aragao
Chico (footballer, born 1998), Brazilian footballer Francisco Alves da Silva Neto
Chico César (born 1964), Brazilian singer, composer and songwriter
Diego Corrales (1977–2007), American professional boxer
Chico DeBarge (born 1966), American R&B singer
Chico Díaz (born 1959), Mexican-born Brazilian actor
Chico Faria (1949–2004), Portuguese footballer
Chico Flores (born March 1987), Spanish footballer José Manuel Flores Moreno
Chico Freeman (born 1949), American jazz musician
Chico Hamilton (1921–2013), American jazz drummer and bandleader
Ray "Chico" Hopkins (born 1946), Welsh rugby player
Chico Maki (1939–2015), Canadian National Hockey League player
Chico Marx (1887–1961), American comedian, actor, pianist and bandleader, member of the Marx Brothers, born Leonard Marx
Chico Mendes (1944–1988), Brazilian rubber tapper, trade union leader and environmentalist. See also Chico Té below.
Chico Netto (1894–1959), Brazilian footballer
Washington "Chico" Oliveira (born 1977), half of the Chico & Roberta Brazilian song and dance duo
Chico Resch (born 1948), Canadian retired National Hockey League goaltender and television sportscaster
Eduardo Rózsa-Flores (1960–2009), Bolivian-Hungarian soldier, journalist, actor and secret agent
Chico Salmon (1940–2000), Major League Baseball utility player from Panama
Chico Serra (born 1957), Brazilian Formula One race car driver
Chico Slimani (born 1971), British singer
Chico Té (1939–1978), Francisco Mendes was a Guinea-Bissau politician
Chico Walker (born 1957), American former Major League Baseball catcher
Chico Xavier (1910–2002), Brazilian spiritist medium

Surname
Gery Chico (born 1956), American lawyer and politician
Moraíto Chico II (1956–2011), Spanish Flamenco guitarist
Mariano Chico (1796–1850), Governor of Alta California, Mexico, in 1836
Matt Chico (born 1983), American former baseball pitcher

Other
Chico Lanete (born 1979), Philippine Basketball Association player
Chico (artist), American graffiti artist Antonio Garcia, whose tag is "Chico"
Chico Álvarez (singer) (born Ernesto Peraza), American Latin jazz musician
Bryan Alvarez (born 1975), American newsletter editor and professional wrestler under the ring name Chico Alvarez
Chico Science (1966–1997), stage name of Brazilian singer and composer Francisco de Assis França

Entertainment
Chico Escuela, a recurring character played by Garrett Morris on Saturday Night Live
Chuck Billy (Chuck Billy 'n' Folks), a character created by Mauricio de Sousa and called Chico Bento in Portuguese
Chico (album), a 1977 album by Chico Freeman
Chico (film), a 2001 film starring Eduardo Rózsa-Flores, based on his life
Chico and the Man, 1970s American television sitcom

Other
California State University, Chico
CHICO (construction company), a Chinese construction company based in Henan
Volkswagen Chico, a 1992 concept car
Chico Senior High School, Chico, California
Chico (Amtrak station), a railroad station in Chico, California
Chicos, an Australian confectionery
Chico language
Chico (cat), a cat who is the narrator of an authorized biography of Pope Benedict XVI
An alternate name for the Sapodilla (Manilkara zapota), widely used in tropical Asia
Operation Chico, a 1958 Civil Defense exercise in California
 Chikoriki, a character in the American animated children's CW4Kids television series GoGoRiki

See also

Chic (disambiguation)
Chica (disambiguation)
El Chico (disambiguation)
Chicão (disambiguation)
Chiko Roll, an Australian savoury snack, inspired by the Chinese egg roll and spring rolls
Gabriel Campillo (born 1978), Spanish professional boxer known as "Chico Guapo"

Lists of people by nickname
Portuguese masculine given names